Phetharbital (phenetharbital) is a barbiturate derivative. It has anticonvulsant effects and relatively weak sedative action, and is considered to have a low abuse potential.

References 

Barbiturates
GABAA receptor positive allosteric modulators
Anticonvulsants
Anilides